The 1895 North Dakota Agricultural Aggies football team was an American football team that represented North Dakota Agricultural College (now known as North Dakota State University) as an independent during the 1895 college football season. The Aggies had the exact same schedule as the previous year.

Schedule

References

North Dakota Agricultural
North Dakota State Bison football seasons
North Dakota Agricultural Aggies football